Gare de Martigues is a railway station serving the town Martigues, Bouches-du-Rhône department, southeastern France. It is served by trains between Marseille and Miramas.

References

TER Provence-Alpes-Côte-d'Azur
Railway stations in France opened in 1915
Railway stations in Bouches-du-Rhône